The common flexor tendon is a tendon that attaches to the medial epicondyle of the humerus (lower part of the bone of the upper arm that is near the elbow joint).   

It serves as the upper attachment point for the superficial muscles of the front of the forearm:
Flexor carpi ulnaris
Palmaris longus
 Flexor carpi radialis
Pronator teres
 Flexor digitorum superficialis

See also
 Common extensor tendon

References

Tendons